Platytesis is a genus of moths of the family Crambidae. It contains only one species, Platytesis semifurva, which is found in Thailand.

References

Natural History Museum Lepidoptera genus database

Pyraustinae
Crambidae genera
Monotypic moth genera
Taxa named by George Hampson